"Up Jumps da Boogie" is the debut single by hip-hop duo Timbaland & Magoo (then known as Magoo and Timbaland), released on July 11, 1997, as the first single from their debut studio album, Welcome to Our World. The track features rapper Missy Elliott and R&B singer Aaliyah. The song peaked at No. 12 on the Billboard Hot 100 singles chart, No. 1 on the Hot Rap Singles chart, and No. 4 on the Hot R&B/Hip-Hop Singles & Tracks chart.

Track listing
 CD single
 "Up Jumps da Boogie" (Radio Version) — 4:56
 "Up Jumps da Boogie" (Short Version) — 4:11

Charts and certifications

Weekly charts

Year-end charts

Certifications

|}

References

1997 debut singles
1997 songs
Aaliyah songs
Timbaland songs
Missy Elliott songs
Song recordings produced by Timbaland
Songs written by Missy Elliott
Songs written by Melvin Barcliff
Songs written by Timbaland
Music videos directed by Bille Woodruff
Blackground Records singles